The Copa Chile Green Cross 1961 was the 4th edition of the Chilean Cup tournament. The competition started on March 11, 1961 and concluded on June 29, 1961. Santiago Wanderers won the competition for the second time, beating Universidad Católica on goal difference.

Matches were scheduled to be played at the stadium of the team named first on the date specified for each round. From the beginning of the second Round, if scores were level after 90 minutes had been played, an extra time took place.

Calendar

First round

Second round

Quarterfinals

Semifinals

Finals

Top goalscorers
 Antolín Sepúlveda (Rangers) 6 goals
 Carlos Hoffmann (Santiago Wanderers) 6 goals
 Mario Soto (U. Católica) 6 goals

See also
 1961 Campeonato Nacional
 Primera B

References
Revista Estadio (Santiago, Chile) March, May 1961 (revised scores & information)
RSSSF (secondary source)

Copa Chile
Chil
1961
Football competitions in Chile